A.R.C.H.I.E. is a 2016 American-Canadian science fiction film written and directed by and starring Robin Dunne and featuring the voice of Michael J. Fox.  It is Dunne's feature directorial debut.

Cast
Michael J. Fox as A.R.C.H.I.E (voice)
Katharine Isabelle as Brooke Benton
Robin Dunne as Paul
Sarah Desjardins as Isabel Sullivan
Fred Ewanuick as Hugh

Reception 
SciFiPulse.net reviewed the film, writing that "Overall. A.R.C.H.I.E. is a fun ride that kids of all ages including grown-up ones like me will enjoy. The writing is solid in creating a fun world and sympathetic and relatable characters." The Dove Foundation gave A.R.C.H.I.E a seal of approval.

Sequel
The film spawned a sequel released in 2018 titled A.R.C.H.I.E. 2: Mission Impawsible. The sequel received reviews from Dove and Common Sense Media.

References

External links
 
 

2016 directorial debut films
2016 science fiction films
Canadian science fiction films
English-language Canadian films
2010s English-language films
2010s Canadian films